James Beekman (1732–1807) was a New York City merchant and a member of the prominent Beekman family.

Early life
James Beekman was born in 1732, the son of William Beekman (1684–1770) and Catharine De Lanoy (1691–1765), niece of Peter Delanoy, the first elected Mayor of New York City after British rule.  His paternal grandparents were Gerardus Beekman (1653–1723), the acting Governor of the Province of New York in 1710, and Magdalena Abeel (1661–1731), sister of Johannes Abeel (1667–1711), the second mayor of Albany. His great-grandfather was Wilhelmus Beekman (1623–1707), a Dutch immigrant who came to New Amsterdam from the Netherlands on the same vessel as Peter Stuyvesant. Wilhelmus soon became Treasurer of the Dutch West India Company and later became the Mayor of New York City, Governor of Delaware from 1653 to 1664, and Governor of Pennsylvania from 1658 to 1663.

Mount Pleasant
He is best remembered for his mansion, known as Mount Pleasant, which he built in Manhattan on the East River in 1763, near the northwest corner of 1st Avenue and East 51st Street. This mansion served as the British military headquarters during the American Revolution, and was the site of the trial of Nathan Hale.

Personal life

In 1752, he was married to Janneke "Jane" Keteltas (1734–1817), daughter of Abraham Keteltas and Jeanne d'Honneur, and sister of Abraham Keteltas (1732–1798).  Together, they had:
William Beekman (b. 1754)
Abraham Keteltas Beekman (1756–1816), who married his cousin, Johanna Beekman
James Beekman, Jr. (1758–1837), who married Lydia Watkins Drew
Jane Beekman (b. 1760), who married Stephen Van Cortlandt
Catharine "Caty" Beekman (b. 1762), who married Elisha Boudinot, brother of Elias Boudinot, in 1805.
Mary Beekman (b. 1765), who married Stephen N. Bayard.
John Beekman (1768–1843), who married Mary Elizabeth Goad Bedlow (1771–1848)
Cornelia Beekman (b. 1770)
Elisabet Beekman (b. 1773)
Gerard Beekman (1774–1833), who married Catharine Saunders (1785-1835)

Legacy
Beekman is known to have commissioned portraits of his children from the painter John Durand, and the entry for payment in his account book, dating to 1766, is the first record of the artist in New York. On his death in 1807, Beekman left  inherited the family's country estate and portraits to his son, James Beekman, Jr.  Upon his son's death in 1837, the estate was passed to James Beekman Jr.'s nephew, James William Beekman, the son of Gerard Beekman.

Exhibition
In 2004, the New-York Historical Society presented an exhibition based around a coach owned by Beekman, one of only three such coaches to survive in its original condition. Beekman had bought the coach in 1771 from Peter Burton, a London sea captain, for £138.

Notes

1732 births
1807 deaths
Businesspeople from New York City
18th-century American businesspeople
19th-century American businesspeople
American merchants
American people of Dutch descent
Beekman family